Testoni–Valla rivalry was an individual sport rivalry engaged in for about eleven years (from 1929 to 1940) between two Italian women's athletes, Claudia Testoni and Ondina Valla, both born in Bologna.

International medals

World records
Testoni has set three world records, Valla one.

Valla-Testoni (60-34)
Direct clashes between the two athletes, between 1929 and 1940, were a total of 99, with 60 victories Valla, 34 of Testoni and 5 draws. Testoni won 17 of the last 19 clash, but not the most important at 1936 Summer Olympics.

1929-1932 (33)

1936-1940 (19)

See also
 Claudia Testoni
 Ondina Valla
 Athletics at the 1936 Summer Olympics – Women's 80 metres hurdles
 Women's 80 metres hurdles world record progression
 Italian record progression women's long jump
 List of sports rivalries

References

External links
  Ondina e Claudia corsero col vento. E Bologna conquistò Olimpia
 Statistics of Claudia Testoni career at Trackfield.brinkster.net
 Statistics of Ondina Valla career at Trackfield.brinkster.net

Individual rivalries in sports
Sport in Bologna